Pareuchontha fuscivena is a moth of the family Notodontidae first described by James S. Miller in 2008. It is found in the western foothills of the Andes in Colombia.

The ground color of the forewings is olive brown but slightly darker along the anal margin. The ground color of the hindwings is chocolate brown to dark brown and is generally darker than in the forewings.

Etymology
The name combines two Latin words: fuscus (meaning tawny or dark) and vena (meaning a vein) and refers to a diagnostic trait of the species, in which the hindwing cubital vein is lined with dark brown scales as it passes through the light-colored central area.

References

Moths described in 2008
Notodontidae of South America